Fascinating Fingers is a collaboration album by musicians Clutchy Hopkins and Shawn Lee. It was released in 2009 on vinyl and CD, both under the Ubiquity Records label.

Track listing 
 "70 MPH Isn't Fast Enough to Get Out of Nebraska" – 4:00
 "7 Inch" – 3:03
 "Mimi Tatonka" – 3:36
 "Root Trees" – 3:54
 "Cross Rhodes" – 3:16
 "Chapter 2" – 3:22
 "Ancient Chinese Secret" – 3:58
 "Fish Sauce" – 4:04
 "Name Game" – 4:46
 "Bootie Beat" – 4:02
 "Willie Groovemaker" – 4:41
 "What More Can I Say (Top Chillin')" – 3:24

References

External links 
 Ubiquityrecords.com
 Discogs.com

2009 albums